City Year is an American education nonprofit organization founded in 1988. The organization partners with public schools in 29 high-need communities across the US and through international affiliates in the UK and Johannesburg, South Africa. City Year teams are made up of 18 to 24 year olds, who provide student, classroom, and whole school support, intended to help students stay in school and on track to graduate high school. City Year is a member of the AmeriCorps national service network, and is supported by the Corporation for National and Community Service, school district partnerships, and private philanthropy from corporations, foundations and individuals.

History
City Year was founded in 1988 by Michael Brown and Alan Khazei, then-roommates at Harvard Law School, who felt strongly that young people in service could be a powerful resource for addressing America's most pressing issues. They built City Year with the conviction that one person can make a difference. Since its inception, City Year has promoted the vision of service as a common expectation – and a real opportunity – for citizens all around the world.

City Year AmeriCorps members initially focused their efforts on community rehabilitation, beautification of neighborhoods, and developing community awareness in Boston. Over the years, the organization has expanded, opening sites in 28 cities throughout the US, and refocused its mission to help students in under-served schools reach their full potential and graduate from high school.

Inspired by a visit with City Year during his 1992 presidential campaign, Bill Clinton enlisted the help of Michael Brown, Alan Khazei and others to establish AmeriCorps through the National and Community Service Trust Act of 1993. Since then, more than 1 million AmeriCorps members have contributed upwards of 1.2 billion hours of public service. All AmeriCorps members, originally conceived as unpaid volunteers in service, are now paid a stipend by the federal government through the Corporation for National and Community Service and subsequently through a variety of matching grants, including the Segal AmeriCorps Education Award. City Year, along with thousands of other nonprofit organizations, is a member of the AmeriCorps network, a program of the Corporation for National and Community Service.

In early 2005, City Year opened its first international site in South Africa. A second international affiliate, City Year London based in London, England, followed in 2010, with City Year Birmingham and City Year Greater Manchester opening in the U.K. in 2013 and 2015, respectively.

In 2012, City Year announced its Long-Term Impact (LTI) goal to dramatically increase the number of students on track to graduation, reaching the majority of off-track students in each of its communities, and expanding to cities and schools that produce two-thirds of the nation's urban dropouts.[2] Based on national research from Johns Hopkins University and City Year's analysis of existing markets, roughly 15 to 20 percent of schools are producing the majority of the dropouts within urban school districts. This degree of concentration enables City Year AmeriCorps members to have an outsized impact on the graduation pipeline in each of their cities, while deploying to a relatively small number of schools. The goal of the strategy is to significantly increase graduation rates and college and career readiness in high-need urban schools by ensuring that 80 percent of students served by City Year reach the tenth grade on time and on track to graduate. City Year AmeriCorps members function as a "human capital resource" in under-resourced elementary, middle and high schools, working with off-track students and students at risk for falling off track to provide targeted academic and social-emotional interventions aimed at improving the number of high school graduates.

Full-time school based service

City Year AmeriCorps members commit to 11 months of service, leadership development and civic engagement, serving as tutors, mentors and role models in high-need schools. City Year responds to the challenges facing public education by providing Whole School, Whole Child (WSWC) services in high-need education institutions across the country. These services are rooted in using data to monitor student progress to better meet student needs, engaging in one-on-one and small group instruction in ELA and math with embedded social-emotional supports, establishing whole school activities that improve conditions for learning along with engaging families and inspiring civic engagement. City Year also provides extended-day activities: after-school programming, homework assistance, enrichment curricula and civic projects that build and serve communities.

City Year AmeriCorps members are supervised by full-time, on site City Year staff called Impact Managers and these corps members and staff become integrated into the fabric of the school community. They collaborate with the school principal and teachers to deliver holistic, data-driven interventions at the individual student, classroom and school-wide levels that help the school achieve its vision for educational excellence.

City Year also provides small group social-emotional skill building sessions, additional capacity in the classroom and classroom management support. City Year helps to close gaps in high-need schools by providing students with personalized support and additional developmental relationships while also providing schools with increased capacity to implement research-based reforms.

City Year's model is based on research indicating that students who are at greatest risk of dropping out can be identified as early as in the sixth grade. City Year AmeriCorps members make positive connections with students, encourage them to come to school every day, and provide evidence-based academic supports for students who exhibit one or more early warning indicators: low attendance, poor behavior or course failure in English or math. Research shows that preventing one or more of these warning signs makes it three times more likely that a student will graduate, dramatically improving his or her lifetime trajectory.

In the 2017 – 2018 academic year, more than 3,000 City Year AmeriCorps members are serving approximately 223,000 students in 329 schools nationwide.

Site locations
City Year serves in 29 cities within the United States, with two international affiliates.

*Highlighted entries are international locations

The corps
City Year AmeriCorps members represent a diverse array of racial, ethnic, religious and educational backgrounds. Approximately 80% of corps members are recent college graduates, 56% are people of color, 48% are Pell Grant eligible, 42% are fluent or conversational in a second language and 25% are first generation college students.

AmeriCorps members begin their service year in the summertime, undergoing several weeks of intensive training before the beginning of the school year. During this training, corps members are oriented to City Year culture and trained on how to work within schools. They are assigned to serve on a team at a particular school, where they will work for the duration of their service year.

Like other AmeriCorps members, City Year corps members receive a biweekly living allowance, or modest stipend. City Year AmeriCorps also receive health insurance benefits and qualify for a post-service Segal Education Award through AmeriCorps. Additionally, City Year has local partnerships in all cities that offer benefits such as public transit passes and discounts to local businesses just for City Year AmeriCorps members.

Leadership development
City Year has developed a comprehensive approach to leadership development designed to ensure AmeriCorps member success at City Year, and in whatever field City Year alumni choose to enter after their year of service. City Year was founded on the belief that a year of service transforms both the community being served and the individual providing that service. City Year recognizes that the development of new skills and knowledge is crucial, but there are also some deeper questions that need to be explored in the journey of leadership development.

United States funding
City Year's funding comes from a variety of sources. In 2017, 23% of the organization's operating revenue came from AmeriCorps, 54% from corporations, foundations and individual donors, and 23% from school districts and other local government grants.

Schools
Public school districts partner with City Year to bring teams of AmeriCorps member to work in schools. Though it varies from district to district, schools are responsible for financing a portion of the cost of maintaining a team of City Year AmeriCorps members in service.

Care Force
Care Force is a part of City Year specifically created to engage corporations and their employees in high-impact volunteer events to help improve schools and communities.

Care Force has helped to craft and lead volunteer experiences that have become an integral component of corporate partners' community service outreach, and inspired employees to want to serve again and again. Whether painting inspirational murals in a school hallway or transforming an unused space into a library; Care Force events physically transform the spaces where children and communities grow.

Since launching in 2001, Care Force has led more than 100,000 volunteers in service projects and managed more than 700 events, and worked in over 220 communities in 10 countries over three continents.

Awards
City Year is a five-time winner of the Social Capitalist award from the Fast Company Monitor group.[8] City Year has received positive reviews from the Princeton Review and the U.S. News & World Report, and has earned four stars from the organization, Charity Navigator.[9] City Year was also named to the Philanthropy 400, an annual ranking of America's nonprofits based on the contributions they raise from individuals, foundations, and corporations by the Chronicle of Philanthropy, in 2015 and 2016.

Criticism
The organization has also been criticized by some for accepting a sponsorship from the soft drink manufacturer PepsiCo. Because City Year Corps members are role models to many children, this partnership might encourage greater consumption of soft drinks, which some see problematic in light of the current national woes with childhood obesity.[10] 

City Year is also criticized because Corp members are paid a stipend that is below the poverty line and while being required to work an almost 50-hour work week, as well as for serving to privatize public education. Americorps members are exempted from many labor protections.  As of 2022, the Segal Education award was $6,495, equal to less than a year of the national average in state public college tuition.

City Year South Africa
In 2001 at a conference on civil society in Cape Town, US President Bill Clinton brought a delegation of City Year Service Leaders and staff from Boston, to meet with South African President Nelson Mandela. Mandela was eager to implement a programme in South Africa that afforded young people the opportunity to serve their communities. He loved the idea of City Year and after further conversations; City Year's first international site was launched in 2005 with 110 Service Leaders in Johannesburg.

City Year brings together a diverse group of young people for a year of voluntary service and leadership development. These young people work in teams as tutors, mentors and role models to children in 10 primary schools throughout Johannesburg and Soweto. City Year South Africa works to support the growing National Youth Service movement, with a strong belief that youth service is a powerful vehicle for developing a generation of young leaders for South Africa, promoting a culture of service across all sectors of society, addressing critical development needs in schools and communities, and addressing youth unemployment.

City Year South Africa provides a year of full-time community service, leadership development and skills training to young South African volunteers (Service Leaders).

Since its inception in 2005 City Year South Africa has graduated over 1,200 Service Leaders who engaged over 20,000 children through after-school programs and various other projects. In total these Service Leaders have completed over 1 million hours of service.

City Year London
City Year launched in London during the 2010/11 academic year with 60 corps members working in teams across six primary schools. For the start of the 2011/12 school year City Year had 81 corps members serving across nine schools.[12]

Since the 2010 general election, City Year London has met with range of Members of Parliament, government ministers, and Prime Minister David Cameron to champion service opportunities for young people across the UK.[13]

In 2012 City Year London was awarded a Social Action Fund grant of £300,000 by the Government's Cabinet Office, which has gone towards the expansion of City Year's service across London and the development of three new school partnerships from September 2012.[14]

Leadership development
Leadership development days include CV and interview guidance, work-shadowing, networking sessions, public speaking and presentation skills training. Each corps member is also matched with a corporate mentor.[15] 95% of corps members who graduated from the 2011/12 City Year London programme successfully secured a place in education or employment after City Year.[16]

IVR evaluation
An evaluation of City Year London's work in schools was conducted by the Institute for Volunteering Research in November 2012. It found that corps members were having a positive effect on the attainment, behaviour and focus of school children and that teachers valued the help and support they received from corps members in the classroom. The evaluation also highlighted a boost in confidence and the employability of City Year corps members who have completed the programme.[17]

The London Corps
Approximately 60% of City Year London's current corps members are graduates while 40% are college leavers.

Private Equity Foundation
The Private Equity Foundation helped to bring City Year from America to London in 2010. The Chief Executive of the Private Equity Foundation, Shaks Ghosh visited City Year in Boston in 2009 and was so impressed by its 'double benefit' model that she donated £1 million to help start up City Year in London. The Private Equity Foundation is City Year London's Lead Founding Partner.

See also
 National Civilian Community Corps
 Peace Corps
 Teach For America

Notes

References

External links
 City Year

1988 establishments in the United States
AmeriCorps organizations
Charities for young adults
Children's charities based in the United States
Community-building organizations
Foreign charities operating in South Africa
Charities based in Massachusetts
Youth development organizations
Educational organizations based in the United States
Organizations established in 1988
Non-profit organizations based in Boston
Foreign charities operating in the United Kingdom
Youth organizations based in Massachusetts
Service year programs in the United States